The Tej Gyan Foundation is a humanitarian organization based in Pune, India. The objective of the foundation is to create a "highly evolved society" through the motto of "Happy Thoughts". The foundation is best known for its spiritual retreats and events, which included the Happy Thoughts World Peace Festival which was held on 10 October 2010, where the Dalai Lama was a guest and speaker. The foundation is also in the Limca Book of Records for their book Magic of Awakening and Warrior's Mirror.



History
The Tej Gyan Foundation was founded in 1997 by Sirshree. The foundation was created to help people realise the true purpose of their life. This method of understanding was created by Sirshree, and is known as the "existential wisdom of the ultimate truth."

Since it was created, the foundation has been responsible for publishing a number of books about spirituality. These books have included the two most famous books, The Warrior's Mirror and The Magic of Awakening. The two books were published by Penguin India in 2010 and 2011 respectively.

The foundation has also created a number of events and seminars based on Sirshree's teachings. This includes the seminar Fearless Child, the program focuses on cultivating the fearlessness.

Sirshree's published works
Sirshree has written over one hundred and fifty books. His books have been translated in more than ten languages and published by leading publishers like Penguin Books, Hay House, WOW Publishings Pvt. Ltd. etc.

World Peace Festivals

The foundation is best known for its events and World Peace Festivals. These have been running since 2010, when the foundation launched their regional World Peace Festivals in India to promote World Peace. The Happy Thoughts World Peace Festival is their most notable, where The Dalai Lama was an honored guest and speaker.

In 2011 the foundation managed the event World Peace through Words of Peace, where Shahrukh Khan inaugurated the book "The Source – Power of Happy Thoughts", which was written by Sirshree.

Programs
The foundation offers different programs on various topics from spiritual well being to relationships and mediation. The programs are designed for all age groups. Residential programs are also organised at Tej-gyan centers (Tej-sthan) across most of the cities in India and at their main center, Manan Ashram, Pune, Maharashtra. The website for Tej-gyan foundation has all the details including the schedule and the fees for these programs. One of the programs is called Fearless Child and is designed for children to help them be fearless and gain confidence.

The foundation also has a radio program that they use to play discourses, bhajans, and mediation sessions. The programs are scheduled in advance so that those wishing to listen will know in advance what programs will be played. The radio program is also free for those wishing to listen and can be downloaded from their website.

References

External links
 
 
 
 Blog and Online Store
 Speakingtree
 24/7 Hindi Internet Radio

Organisations based in Pune
Foundations based in India
Spiritual organizations
1997 establishments in Maharashtra
Organizations established in 1997
Articles containing video clips